Femur epicondyle may refer to:

 Lateral epicondyle of the femur
 Medial epicondyle of the femur